The 2020–21 DFB-Pokal was the 41st season of the annual German football cup competition. Several teams participated in the competition, including all teams from the previous year's Frauen-Bundesliga and the 2. Frauen-Bundesliga, excluding second teams. The competition began on 19 September 2020 with the first of six rounds and ended on 30 May 2021 with the final at the RheinEnergieStadion in Cologne, a nominally neutral venue, which has hosted the final since 2010. The DFB-Pokal is considered the second-most important club title in German women's football after the Bundesliga championship. The DFB-Pokal is run by the German Football Association (DFB).

The defending champions were Frauen-Bundesliga side VfL Wolfsburg, after they defeated SGS Essen in the previous final.

Wolfsburg went on to win the title for the seventh consecutive time, after defeating Eintracht Frankfurt 1–0 in the final.

Effects of the COVID-19 pandemic
On 31 August 2020, the DFB Executive Committee decided to extend the use of five substitutions in matches (with a sixth allowed in extra time) to the 2020–21 season, which was implemented at the end of the previous season to lessen the impact of fixture congestion caused by the COVID-19 pandemic. The use of five substitutes, based on the decision of competition organisers, had been extended by IFAB until 2021.

Participating clubs
The following 52 clubs qualified for the competition:

Format
Clubs from lower leagues will host against clubs from higher leagues until the quarter-finals. Should both clubs play below the 2. Bundesliga, there will be no host club change anymore. In the first round, the matches are split into a "North" and "South" zone.

Schedule
The rounds of the 2020–21 competition are scheduled as follows:

First round
The draw was made on 25 August 2020. The matches were played on 19, 20, 26 and 27 September 2020.

Second round
The draw was made on 1 October 2020. The matches were played on 31 October and 1 November 2020.

Round of 16
The draw was made on 8 November 2020. The matches were played on 5 and 6 December 2020 and in early 2021.

Quarterfinals
The draw for the round of 16 was held on 3 January 2021. The matches took place from 19 to 21 March 2021.

Semifinals
The draw was held on 28 February 2021. The matches took place on 3 and 4 April 2021.

Final

Top goalscorers

Notes

References

Women
2020–21